Martin of Dacia (Martinus Dacus, Martinus de Dacia, Morten Mogensen, c. 1240 - 10 August 1304) was a Danish scholar and  theologian.  
He authored De Modi significandi   (ca. 1270), an influential treatise on grammar.

Biography
Morten Mogensen was born at Ribe in Jutland  probably in the late 1240s or early 1250s.  Mogensen  received his theological doctorate in Paris where  he  obtained the degree of a Magister artium and Magister theologiae. From the 1290s, he held a Prebendary as Canon of the Ribe Cathedral in the Ribe diocese  as well as Provost of Schleswig and Canon of Lund. In Schleswig, Mogensen established a vicarage in the parish of Sywertmanrip.
 
Mogensen was  mentioned in 1288 as royal chancellor of Danish King Eric VI Menved  (reign 1286 –1319).
In the dispute between Jens Grand, Archbishop of Lund, and King Eric VI Menved,  Mogensen arranged  a royal rapprochement to Pope Boniface VIII, which in 1302 resulting in a settlement of the dispute. In 1302 he gave a donation to the chapter of Notre Dame in Paris. He founded an altar for the cathedral in Roskilde in 1303.   Mogensen died during 1304 in Paris and was buried at Notre Dame.

Name
The rendering of his name, Morten Mogensen, into Medieval Latin as Martinus de Dacia stems from the fact that, during the Middle Ages, the toponym Dania  meaning Denmark, was occasionally confused with the historic region of Dacia in the Balkans.

Works 
Danicorum Medii Aevi 
De Modi significandi des Martinus de Dacia
Quaestiones super Artem Veterem

See also 
 Modistae

References

Other sources
 Martini de Dacia Opera (1961) ed. Heinrich Roos in Corpus Philosophorum Danicorum Medii Aevi   (Copenhagen: G. E.C. Gad)

External links
 Oxford Index page

1240 births
1304 deaths
Catholic philosophers
Danish philosophers
Danish Roman Catholic priests
13th-century Latin writers
13th-century philosophers
13th-century Danish people